Bremen Switzerland (Northern Low Saxon: Bremer Swiez) is an undulating geest landscape in the north of Bremen (Bremen Nord) and the adjacent district of Osterholz, and forms the western portion of the Osterholz Geest.
The region of the Bremen Switzerland is framed by the Weser tributary of Lesum to the south, the Weser to the west, the marsh region of Osterstade to the northwest, the forest of Düngel to the north (Garlstedt-Meyenburg line), the former B 6 federal route to Bremerhaven (now the L135) to the east and the adjoining heath of Lange Heide.

Bremen Switzerland is divided into nature reserves, meadows, woods, heathland and depressions like the Ihle valley and the valleys of the Schönebecker Aue, the Blumenthaler Aue and the Beckedorfer Beeke. As a result, it is a favourite destination for many leisure pursuits like walking, cycling, jogging or riding. Facilities include the  Bremen Switzerland Golf Course.

See also 
 Regions whose name incorporates "Switzerland"

References

External links 
 Bremen Switzerland Action Group (Source for parts of the text)
 Tours recommended by the ADFC
 Bremen-Nord Inland Dune Action Group

Geography of Bremen (state)
Regions of Lower Saxony
Osterholz
Geest